Surabhi Vani Devi (born 1 April 1952) is an Indian politician, academic and artist. She is the daughter of P. V. Narasimha Rao, former Prime Minister of India. She was elected as MLC in Telangana Legislative Council election from Mahbubnagar–Rangareddy–Hyderabad Graduates constituency in March 2021.

Early life 
Vani Devi was born to former Prime Minister of India, P. V. Narasimha Rao on 1 April 1952 in Vangara village of then Karimnagar district in Telangana, India. She did her schooling from HSC from Govt. Girls High School, Hyderguda, B.A. from Osmania University and Diploma in Fine Arts from JNTU. She served as Lecturer in JNTU between 1990 to 1995.

Academic activities 
Vani Devi is an artist, educationist, social activist past 35 years, founder-principal of the Sri Venkateshwara Group of Institutions. She established Surabhi Educational Society, Sri Venkateshwara College of Fine Arts In the year 1991.

As an artist 
She is an artist, her favorite subject is Nature and medium is Water Colors and Acrylics. She has held more than 15 solo exhibitions, several group shows, seminars, talks in India and abroad since 1973.

Awards 
 Awarded International Women’s Achievement Award by Telangana State Government in 2016.
 Awarded Pratibha Puraskar award by Potti Sreeramulu Telugu University.

References

Telangana politicians
Women from Telangana
1952 births
Living people
Members of the Telangana Legislative Council